The Climate Group is a non-profit organisation that works with businesses and government leaders around the world to address climate change. The Group has programmes focusing on renewable energy and reducing greenhouse gas emissions. Launched in 2004, the organisation operates globally with offices in the UK (headquarters), the United States and India.

It acts as the secretariat for the Under2 Coalition, an alliance of state and regional governments around the world that are committed to reducing their greenhouse gas emissions to net-zero levels by 2050. As of 2022, the Under2 Coalition brings together over 270 governments representing 1.75 billion people and 50% of the world economy.

The organisation's business initiatives "RE100", "EP100" and "EV100", which are run as part of the We Mean Business coalition, aim to grow corporate demand for renewable energy, energy productivity and electric transport, accelerating the transition to a zero-emissions economy, while helping leading businesses to reduce carbon emissions, be more resilient and increase profits.

Other projects, past and present, include the LED "LightSavers" global trials, which took place in cities such as New York City, Hong Kong and Kolkata; the Climate Principles project, under which financial institutions (including Credit Agricole, HSBC, Standard Chartered, Swiss Re, F&C Asset Management and BNP Paribas) agree to consider climate change when structuring their service and product offerings; the States and Regions Alliance, designed to encourage state, provincial and city government climate change initiatives; and numerous publications assessing and promoting the potential value of low carbon technologies and policies.

They have partnered on initiatives and reports with organisations, including the Global e-Sustainability Initiative (GeSi), the International Emissions Trading Association (IETA), CDP, the Global Infrastructure Basel Foundation, the New York Academy of Sciences, the United Nations Foundation, the German Marshall Fund, the Office of Tony Blair and the World Business Council on Sustainable Development.

The Climate Group hosts international summits and events, including Climate Week NYC in New York City, a week-long global forum promoting global climate action, and the India Energy Access Summit in New Delhi.

History
The Climate Group was initiated in 2003 and launched in 2004 by ex-CEO and co-founder Steve Howard, together with ex-Chief Operating Officer Jim Walker and former Communications Director Alison Lucas. It evolved from research led by the Rockefeller Brothers Fund and was established to encourage more major companies and sub-national governments to take action on climate change. To join, a company or government had to sign the organisation's leadership principles. Former UK prime minister Tony Blair has supported the group since its launch and has appeared at a number of the organisation's events.

The Climate Group's international network of States and Regions included a number of prominent leaders of sub-national governments that have been or are involved in its policy work in developing renewable energy and reducing greenhouse gas emissions. These include, or have included, Scottish First Minister Alex Salmond; Welsh First Minister Carwyn Jones; Prince Albert of Monaco; former Governor of California, Arnold Schwarzenegger; former Premier of Manitoba, Gary Doer; former Premier of Quebec, Jean Charest; former Premier of South Australia Mike Rann and President of Poitou-Charentes, Ségolène Royal. In successive years, Schwarzenegger, Charest and Salmond each received: The Climate Group's international climate leadership award from Co-Chair Mike Rann. Its network has included over 80 of the world's largest companies and governments (including, for example, the City of New York, Miami, Los Angeles, the State of California, most Canadian and Australian provinces, and the City of London).

In 2011, Mark Kenber, previously deputy-CEO, took over from Steve Howard as CEO. He resigned from the post in 2016.

In 2017, Helen Clarkson became CEO.

Funding
The Climate Group states that it functions independently of any corporate and government entities. It funds its work from a variety of revenue streams. The organisation's 2004 launch was supported primarily by philanthropic organisations, including the Rockefeller Brothers Fund, the DOEN Foundation, the John D and Catherine T. MacArthur Foundation, and the Esmee Fairbairn Foundation. The organisation's 2007-2008 annual report indicated that over 75% of its funding at the time was from philanthropic donations, foundations and other non-governmental organisations, as well as from the now-discontinued philanthropic HSBC Climate Partnership.

Until recently, business and government members paid to be members of The Climate Group, and that funding accounted for approximately 20% of the organisation's operating budget. Many of its programmes are carried out in partnership with members, whose sponsorship is often the primary source of revenue for those individual programmes. The Climate Group state that the overall strategy is driven by staff – sometimes in consultation with members – and approved by its board, and that there is no link between membership and governance of the organisation.

HSBC Climate Partnership
In 2007, HSBC announced that The Climate Group, along with WWF, Earthwatch, and the Smithsonian Tropical Research Institute, would be a partner in the HSBC Climate Partnership, and donated US$100 million to fund joint work – the largest-ever single corporate philanthropic donation to the environment. The results of this programme can be seen in HSBC's 2010 Partnership Review, and HSBC's Clean Cities film of December 2010. The Clean Cities film specifically outlines some of The Climate Group's achievements enabled by this programme, including LED pilots in New York, clean technology finance in Mumbai, consumer campaigns in London, and cutting employee carbon footprints in Hong Kong.

Publications
The Climate Group publishes research reports that seek to highlight the opportunities that clean energy can provide in terms of both economic growth and decreased emissions. Some include:

 Annual Disclosure – each year, The Climate Group and CDP share publicly disclosed data from state and regional governments on their climate targets and actions, emissions inventories and other climate information. The most recent was published in November 2017 at the UNFCCC COP23 global climate talks. 
 Going Beyond – this 2017 report gathers the experiences of three companies that are part of The Climate Group initiative RE100 – Apple Inc., BT Group and IKEA Group – to show what companies can do to overcome challenges and engage their suppliers in the transition to 100% renewable power.
 Energy transition platform – this global initiative supporting highly industrialised, carbon-intensive state and regional governments in developing and implementing innovative clean energy policies, regularly releases case studies from partner regions – Alberta, the Basque Country, California, Hauts-de-France, Lombardy, Minnesota, North Rhine-Westphalia, Silesia, South Australia, Upper Austria and Wales – so they can learn from their global peers. A recent example is one assessing potentially controversial climate and energy issues between various stakeholders within the state of North Rhine-Westphalia.
 Bijli - Clean energy for all – principally funded by the Dutch Postcode Lottery, this 2016 report shows how the subject project helped reduce greenhouse gas emissions and enhanced the lives of rural villagers in India by connecting them to cheaper, cleaner and more reliable renewable energy sources.
 American Clean Revolution – launched in 2012, this report looks at how America could benefit from US$3 trillion net gains for their economy by investing in clean energy and jobs.
 Smart 2020: Enabling the low carbon economy in the information age – this 2008 report, produced in partnership with the Global e-Sustainability Initiative, presents research showing that smarter IT could reduce global emissions by 15% and save EUR€500 billion in annual energy costs by 2020.
 The UK-India Business Leaders Climate Group – launched in February 2010 to provide advice to the UK and India on "how to accelerate collaborative, climate-friendly economic growth".
 China's Clean Revolution series – to December 2010, three reports have been released on China's renewable energy policies. The latest report was released on 6th December 2010, to coincide with COP16 in Cancun, is the China Clean Revolution Report III: Low Carbon Development in Cities.

Initiatives
The Climate Group spearheads and supports several projects, campaigns, and summits. They include:

Under2 Coalition

The Climate Group acts as Secretariat to the Under2 Coalition and works directly with government signatories and partners of the Under2 MOU to drive net-zero ambition and action. The Under2 MOU is a commitment by sub-national governments to reduce their greenhouse gas (GHG) emissions towards net-zero by 2050. Central to this is the public commitment by all signatories to reduce their GHG emissions by 80-95% on 1990 levels, or 2 metric tonnes of carbon dioxide-equivalent per capita, by 2050. As of 2022, the Under2 Coalition brings together 270 governments from different countries representing 1.75 billion people and 50% of the global economy who have committed to reducing GHG emissions towards net-zero by 2050.

LED Scale-Up

This project aims to accelerate the widespread adoption of LED (light-emitting diode) lighting technology. The programme's aim is for LED lighting to represent 25% of the global indoor and outdoor lighting market by 2020, reducing electricity use and costs – and associated CO2 emissions – by 50–70%. Demonstration projects are now operating in many cities across the globe including Hong Kong, Shanghai, Kolkata, London, New York City and Sydney.

RE100

Convened by The Climate Group in partnership with CDP, RE100 is a global initiative to engage, support and showcase influential companies committed to using 100% renewable power. Companies gain a better understanding of the advantages of being 100% renewable and benefit from peer-to-peer learning as well as greater public recognition of their ambitions and achievements as they work towards their goals. As of 2017, a total of 100 companies have committed to the campaign.

EP100

EP100 showcases global businesses committed to doubling their energy productivity (EP). EP100, which The Climate Group serves as the Secretariat for, offers a forum for sharing best practices and showcasing the leadership of companies making progress towards bold, public commitments on energy productivity.

EV100

EV100 is a global initiative bringing together companies committed to accelerating the transition to electric vehicles (EVs) and making electric transport the "new normal" by 2030. The transport sector is the fastest-growing contributor to climate change, accounting for 23% of global energy-related greenhouse gas emissions. Electric transport offers a solution in cutting millions of tonnes of greenhouse gas emissions per year, as well as curbing transport related air and noise pollution.

Climate Week NYC

Climate Week NYC, founded in 2009 as a partnership between The Climate Group, the United Nations, the UN Foundation, the City of New York, the Government of Denmark, Tck Tck Tck Campaign and CDP, takes place every year in New York City. The summit takes place alongside the UN General Assembly and brings together international leaders from business, government and civil society to showcase global climate action. Climate Week NYC is the collaborative space for climate-related events in support of the implementation of the Paris Agreement and the achievement of the UN Sustainable Development Goals. In 2017, there were 140 events across New York City as part of Climate Week NYC.

States and Regions
The Climate Group's States and Regions Alliance was underpinned by a recognition of the important role that sub-national governments are playing in tackling climate change on the ground. The UN Development Programme estimates that 50–80% of actions required to take limit global temperature rises to 2°C will need to arise from sub-national levels of government. The Climate Group argues that while global negotiations continue to prove difficult, its State and Regions Alliance members, as well as other sub-national governments, play an essential role in building a global climate change deal from the bottom up.

Through their States and Regions programme, The Climate Group brought heads of sub-national governments together in events such as Cancún's China Day and Climate Leaders Summit 2010. Agreed statements arising from these events, signed by the organisation's members, include the Copenhagen Statement of 2009 and the Cancun Statement of 2010. The States and Regions programme also facilitated partnerships between developed and developing nation sub-national governments, giving rise to projects such as the assessment of regional vulnerability to climate change impacts.

Past Programmes
 The Carbon Capture and Storage programme, which aims to develop carbon capture and storage demonstration plants in China, India, the US, Europe and Australia.
 The SMART 2020 programme, which aims to harness smart information and communication technologies, such as smart grid technologies and building management systems, to reduce emissions by up to 15% by 2020.
 The EV20 programme, which aims to build the momentum of the electric vehicles market through partnerships with car and battery manufacturers, electricity utilities, financial institutions and governments.
 Together In 2007, The Climate Group launched a consumer engagement campaign in the UK called Together, supported by Tony Blair, Gordon Brown, Boris Johnson, David James, Claudia Schiffer and Annie Lennox. Together worked with big brand names to bring consumers easy ways they can help fight climate change. In May 2009, the Together Campaign reported that its partners had helped UK consumers save over 1 million tonnes of carbon dioxide and around £200 million on their household bills. Together also ran in Australia and the United States.
 The Verified Carbon Standard (VCS) launched in November 2007. The objective of the VCS is to boost confidence in the voluntary carbon market by providing a new and much needed quality assurance for certification of credible voluntary carbon offsets.
 Breaking the Climate Deadlock In late 2009, delegates gathered at the UNFCCC COP-15 in Copenhagen. Climate Group sought to help encourage a fair and effective agreement, along with former UK Prime Minister Tony Blair.
 The Greenhouse Indicator, a weekly indicator of greenhouse gas emissions produced from the generation of energy in Australian states including New South Wales, Queensland, South Australia, Victoria and Tasmania. Emissions are reported in newspaper publications including The Age.
 The Climate Principles, a framework for the finance sector that major international financial institutions such as Credit Agricole, HSBC, Standard Chartered, Swiss Re, F&C Asset Management and BNP Paribas have adopted. Signatories of the Principles are working to include climate change considerations in all of their financial products and services.
 The HSBC Climate Partnership, which includes The Climate Group, Earthwatch Institute, Smithsonian Tropical Research Institute and the World Wide Fund for Nature (WWF). The Partnership aim to reduce major city carbon emissions, monitor climate change impacts on forests and waterways, and empower individuals in their communities and workplaces to contribute to climate change action and research.
 The Aviation Global Deal Group comprising British Airways, Cathay Pacific Airways, Air France KLM, Virgin Atlantic Airways, BAA sought to address greenhouse gas emissions from international aviation.

References

External links
 Official website

Climate change organizations based in the United States
Climate change organisations based in Australia